The 1935 Iowa Hawkeyes football team represented the University of Iowa in the 1935 college football season. This season marks the first time that Iowa played Minnesota for the Floyd of Rosedale

Schedule

References

Iowa
Iowa Hawkeyes football seasons
Iowa Hawkeyes football